Rémi Gomis (born 14 February 1984) is a former professional footballer who played as a midfielder. Born in France, he represented the Senegal national team at international level.

Club career
Gomis began his career with Stade Lavallois and signed for Stade Malherbe Caen in summer 2007. On 13 July 2009, he moved to Valenciennes FC on a four-year contract after two years with Caen. He went to Spanish club Levante UD in summer 2013, but six months after that he broke the contract and left Levante returning to the Ligue 1, joining FC Nantes. In August 2016, he moved to Swiss club FC Wil.

International career
Gomis played his first match with Senegal in 2008.

References

External links
 
 Profile at TangoFoot 
 R. Gomis : "Le club qu’il me fallait"

Living people
1984 births
French footballers
Citizens of Senegal through descent
French sportspeople of Senegalese descent
Sportspeople from Versailles, Yvelines
Senegalese footballers
Footballers from Yvelines
Association football midfielders
Senegal international footballers
2012 Africa Cup of Nations players
FC Versailles 78 players
Stade Lavallois players
Stade Malherbe Caen players
Valenciennes FC players
FC Nantes players
Levante UD footballers
Ligue 1 players
Ligue 2 players
Championnat National players
Championnat National 2 players
Swiss Challenge League players
Senegalese expatriate footballers
Senegalese expatriate sportspeople in Spain
Expatriate footballers in Spain